Jerry W. Stevenson is an American politician and a Republican member of the Utah State Senate representing District 6 since 2023. Prior to redistricting he represented District 21 following his January 25, 2010 appointment to fill the vacancy caused by the resignation of Sheldon Killpack. Stevenson was mayor of Layton from 1994 until 2006.

Early life, education, and career
Stevenson attended Utah State University. He has worked as a Weber State University Trustee, the Wasatch Integrated Energy Chair, doing Military Installation, and as the UTA Rail Committee Chair. His primary profession is as a private business owner. Stevenson is married and has children and grandchildren.

Background
Business Owner 
Weber State University Board of Trusties (chair) 
Envision Utah (former chair)
DATC Board of Trustees
Layton City Government 
Layton City Planning Commission (6 years)
 Layton City Council (8 years) 
Layton City Mayor (12 years)

Political career
Senator Stevenson was appointed to his Senate seat on January 25, 2010. Stevenson is serving as a Senator for the Utah Senate.

In 2016, Stevenson served on the following committees:
Business, Economic Development, and Labor Appropriations Subcommittee
Executive Appropriations Committee (Senate Vice Chair)
Higher Education Appropriations Subcommittee
Senate Economic Development and Workforce Services Committee
Senate Education Committee
Senate Ethics Committee

Senator Stevenson's current committees are:
Economic Development and Workforce Services Interim Committee
Executive Appropriations Committee
Higher Education Appropriations Subcommittee
Point of the Mountain Development Commission
Political Subdivisions Interim Committee
Public Education Appropriations Subcommittee
Senate Business and Labor Committee
Senate Business and Labor Confirmation Committee
Senate Economic Development and Workforce Services Committee
Senate Economic Development and Workforce Services Confirmation Committee
Senate Judiciary, Law Enforcement, and Criminal Justice Committee
Senate Natural Resources, Agriculture, and Environment Confirmation Committee

Elections

Legislation

2016 sponsored bills

Notable legislation 
During the 2016 legislative session Senator Stevenson sponsored and was the floor sponsor for many bills dealing with alcohol laws in Utah. His Senate Bill 250 regulates and clarifies the procedure to sell alcohol through drive up windows.

References

External links
Official page at the Utah State Legislature

Jerry Stevenson at Ballotpedia
Jerry W. Stevenson at the National Institute on Money in State Politics

Place of birth missing (living people)
Year of birth missing (living people)
Living people
Mayors of places in Utah
People from Layton, Utah
Republican Party Utah state senators
Utah State University alumni
21st-century American politicians